Sitruk is a surname. Notable people with the surname include:

 Éric Sitruk (born 1978), French football player 
 Florence Sitruk (born 1974), harpist
 Joseph Sitruk (1944–2016), Chief Rabbi of France 
 Jules Sitruk (born 1990), French actor
 Olivier Sitruk (born 1970, French comedian and actor